Elmer J. Schowalter (October 12, 1894 – June 9, 1964) was a member of the Wisconsin State Assembly.

Biography
Schowalter was born on October 12, 1894, in Jackson, Washington County, Wisconsin. He attended the University of Wisconsin-Madison and became active in his local church. He died after a stroke at St. Joseph's Hospital in West Bend, Wisconsin on June 9, 1964.

Career
Schowalter was a member of the Assembly from 1955 to 1964. He was a Republican.

See also
The Political Graveyard

References

External links

People from Jackson, Washington County, Wisconsin
University of Wisconsin–Madison alumni
1894 births
1964 deaths
20th-century American politicians
Republican Party members of the Wisconsin State Assembly